The Estonian Civil Aviation Administration was the civil aviation authority of Estonia, working in the jurisdiction of Ministry of Economic Affairs and Communications and exercising civil aviation state inspection and supervising over the implementation of national laws and regulations. 
The Estonian Civil Aviation Administration was merged into the Transport Administration on 1 January 2021.

The Civil Aviation Authority had the highest competence in the organization and supervision of aviation safety in Estonia, it was an internationally recognized organization. The Agency dealt with the regulation of civil aviation safety, issued aviation permits, maintained aircraft registers, issued maintenance organization certificates, aircraft airworthiness and flight simulator equipment qualification certificates, organized radio communication (aviation radio conversations) qualification exams, line pilot, commercial pilot and instrument flight competency theory exams, etc.

See also

 Estonian Safety Investigation Bureau

References

External links
 Official website
 

Government agencies of Estonia
Estonia
Civil aviation in Estonia
Transport organizations based in Estonia